The metallic means (also ratios or constants) of the successive natural numbers are the continued fractions:

The golden ratio (1.618...) is the metallic mean between 1 and 2, while the silver ratio (2.414...) is the metallic mean between 2 and 3. The term "bronze ratio" (3.303...), or terms using other names of metals (such as copper or nickel), are occasionally used to name subsequent metallic means. The values of the first ten metallic means are shown at right. Notice that each metallic mean is a root of the simple quadratic equation:
, where  is any positive natural number.

As the golden ratio is connected to the pentagon (first diagonal/side), the silver ratio is connected to the octagon (second diagonal/side). Each Fibonacci number is the sum of the previous number times one plus the number before that, each Pell number is the sum of the previous number times two and the one before that, and each "bronze Fibonacci number" is the sum of the previous number times three plus the number before that. Taking successive Fibonacci numbers as ratios, these ratios approach the golden mean, the Pell number ratios approach the silver mean, and the "bronze Fibonacci number" ratios approach the bronze mean.

Properties 

These properties are valid only for integers m. For nonintegers the properties are similar but slightly different.

The above property for the powers of the silver ratio is a consequence of a property of the powers of silver means. For the silver mean S of m, the property can be generalized as

where

The powers of silver means have other interesting properties:

If n is a positive even integer:

Additionally,

Also,

In general:

The silver mean S of m also has the property that

meaning that the inverse of a silver mean has the same decimal part as the corresponding silver mean.

where a is the integer part of S and b is the decimal part of S, then the following property is true:

For , we then have

Therefore, the silver mean of m is a solution of the equation

It may also be useful to note that the silver mean S of −m is the inverse of the silver mean S of m

Another interesting result can be obtained by slightly changing the formula of the silver mean. If we consider a number

then the following properties are true:

 if c is real,
 if c is a multiple of i.

The silver mean of m is also given by the integral

Another interesting form of the metallic mean is given by

Trigonometric expressions

Geometric Construction 

The metallic mean for any given integer  can be constructed geometrically in the following way.

For , 

 

and so 

 φ. 

Setting  yields the silver ratio. 

 

Thus 

Likewise, the bronze ratio would be calculated with  so

 

yields 

Non-integer arguments sometimes produce triangles with a mean that is itself an integer. Examples include N = 1.5, where

 

and 

Which is simply a scaled-down version of the 3-4-5 Pythagorean triangle.

See also
Constant
Mean
Ratio
Plastic number

Notes

      
  j. OEIS: A084844 Denominators of the continued fraction n + 1/(n + 1/...) [n times].

References

Further reading
Stakhov, Alekseĭ Petrovich (2009). The Mathematics of Harmony: From Euclid to Contemporary Mathematics and Computer Science, p. 228, 231. World Scientific. .

External links
Cristina-Elena Hrețcanu and Mircea Crasmareanu (2013). "Metallic Structures on Riemannian Manifolds", Revista de la Unión Matemática Argentina.
Rakočević, Miloje M. "Further Generalization of Golden Mean in Relation to Euler's 'Divine' Equation", Arxiv.org.